Christopher Kippenberger is an American-German filmmaker, creative director, publisher, designer and visual artist.

Biography

Kippenberger began his career in San Francisco and Los Angeles as a post production specialist. He then relocated to Europe, later collaborating with Spike Jonze to help create vice.com predecessor VBS.tv and going on to found Studio Kippenberger.

Studio Kippenberger

Studio Kippenberger is the production arm of Chris Kippenberger’s practice. Headed by Kippenberger, the studio has worked with companies such as Bugatti, Porsche, Rolls-Royce, Mercedes-Benz, BMW, Vimeo, and Intel in recent years. In addition to content creation, Studio Kippenberger also specializes in digital strategy development, creative content placement and integrated brand consulting.

Filmmaking 

Studio Kippenberger's productions range from client-oriented shorts to the documentary portraits Isle of Man TT and Kart Kids. 

Isle of Man TT is a concise profile of the prestigious annual motorcycle race of the same name and its participants. In interviews with the event's most prominent racers and their teams, the film explores the circuit's sustained appeal in spite of its deadly reputation. Isle of Man TT was honored at the 2015 London Motor Film Festival.

Featured on Nowness, Hypebeast, Highsnobiety, and others, Kippenberger's film Kart Kids is a look into the world of youth karting. Profiling a selection of adolescent racers for over ten years, Kart Kids focuses the sport's high-stakes nature. 

Kippenberger has been dubbed "the most interesting man in car porn," "the Terry Richardson of car videos." and the "king of car porn" by Ulf Poschardt in Die Welt.

Advanced Aviation Prototyping & Robotics 

As an early pioneer in the field of UAV videography, Kippenberger stated in a 2012 interview published in Wired:

“Drones are strictly tools [for] creating a certain look we want to achieve. This is only the very early beginning of this movement and we are thrilled to be involved at such an early stage"

Kippenberger participated in the Drones and Aerial Robotics Conference held at New York University in October 2013 and the TED Conference in Berlin in June 2014.

Véhicule

Christopher Kippenberger’s Véhicule brand was founded in 2019 as a multi-channel platform for “avant-garde transportation.” Véhicule’s first undertaking was an annual magazine exploring the intersections between transportation, popular culture and fine art. The 2020 issue of Véhicule Magazine featured an in-depth investigation of the Miami drug smuggling and powerboating scene in the 1980s. 

In tandem with this feature, Kippenberger founded Véhicule Marine—a Florida-based firm specializing in designing and developing high-powered seagoing watercraft.  

The Véhicule lineup also features Véhicule Automotive, a project initiated by Kippenberger. Véhicule Automotive has focused their efforts on high-end restorations of classic G-Wagens, modifying them with new engines, suspensions and interior fittings.

Véhicule has since expanded to include collections of related apparel.

References

External links
https://www.imdb.com/name/nm10902791/
https://www.nowness.com/topic/christopher-kippenberger/kart-kids-christopher-kippenberger
http://hypebeast.com/2014/9/the-studio-kippenberger-apartment-in-berlin
http://www.highsnobiety.com/2014/04/28/highsnobiety-visits-studio-kippenberger/
http://jalopnik.com/sex-drugs-and-drones-meet-the-most-interesting-man-i-513839220
http://032c.com/2012/christopher-kippenberger-and-legendary-business-woman-and-ralley-driver-heidi-hetzer-in-an-hispano-suiza-oldtimer-in-front-of-berlins-olympia-stadium/
https://www.wired.com/2015/08/isle-of-man-tt-documentary/
http://www.fastcocreate.com/1682320/see-what-you-can-do-with-drone-filmmaking
https://vimeo.com/148657460
https://vimeo.com/93083074

Year of birth missing (living people)
Living people
American filmmakers
German mass media people